Unreal was a series of first-person shooter video games developed by Epic Games. The series was known for its exhibition of the namesake Unreal Engine that powers the games and is available for other developers to license.

Publishing rights for the series have changed hands several times. GT Interactive was the original publisher and would be later succeeded by Infogrames, Atari, and Midway Games.

Games

Anthologies 
 Unreal Anthology (2006) contains Unreal Gold, Unreal Tournament, Unreal II, Unreal Tournament 2004, and a bonus soundtrack CD. However, missing from Unreal Tournament are the improved S3TC textures which came with the original release of the game. Also, the internet connectivity of Unreal in this collection is isolated by having a master server different from that of the original game.

Reception
Guinness World Records awarded the series with 3 world records. These records include, "First Console Game to Receive a Downloadable Patch", "First Console Game to Support Player Modifications" and "First Game to be Created Using the Unreal Engine".

References

External links
 Developer Epic Games website
 Liandri Archives containing a comprehensive history of the Unreal series

 
Video game franchises
Video game franchises introduced in 1998